Microsorum scolopendria, synonym Phymatosorus scolopendria, commonly called  monarch fern, musk fern, maile-scented fern, breadfruit fern,  or wart fern is a species of fern within the family Polypodiaceae. This fern grows in the wild in the Western Pacific rim from Australia to New Caledonia to Fiji and throughout the South Pacific to French Polynesia.

It was introduced in Hawaii in the late 1910s and has subsequently naturalized rapidly. It is found on all main islands. Its Hawaiian name lauaʻe is thought to have originally referred to the native fern Microsorum spectrum.

The scientific name M. scolopendria has been misapplied to Microsorum grossum (and their synonyms in Phymatosorus).

Uses 
When crushed, the fern issues a scent similar to maile. Sometimes, pieces of the fern are interlaced in leis made of strung-up keys (individual drupes) of the pandanus fruit. It is also one of the plants used for scenting kapa fabric.

Folklore 

Expanses of the fern famously grows in Makana on Kauaʻi, and is commemorated in song.

Media

References
Citations

Bibliography

External links
 Gustafson, Robert, 1939- Hawaiian plant life : vegetation and flora  Honolulu : University of Hawaiʻi Press, 2014. 
 Valier, Kathy, 1953- Ferns of Hawai`i Honolulu : University of Hawaii Press, 1995 
 http://digicoll.manoa.hawaii.edu/hawaiiflowers/Pages/viewtext.php?s=browse&tid=252 Plants for Hawaiian lei: Laua'e

Polypodiaceae